William A. James (December 8, 1838 - December 31, 1893) was an American politician and Republican member of the Illinois House of Representatives.

Biography
William A. James was born December 8, 1838, in Providence, Rhode Island. He served in the American Civil War, reaching the rank of colonel in the Union Army. He moved to Chicago in 1865 and open a steam machinery business. After the Great Chicago Fire, he moved to Highland Park, Illinois. He was elected to the Illinois House of Representatives in 1874 and served for three terms. He served as Speaker in his final term. He was later elected Mayor of Highland Park. He died December 31, 1893.

References

1838 births
1893 deaths
Speakers of the Illinois House of Representatives
Republican Party members of the Illinois House of Representatives
People of Illinois in the American Civil War